Larusso (born Laetitia Serero on 11 October 1979) is a French singer. She won the second edition of The Masked Singer France in 2020.

She popularized songs such as "Tu m'oublieras" and "Je survivrai", the latter sung by Régine in the 1980s, which is a French adaptation of "I Will Survive" by Gloria Gaynor.

Discography

Albums
 Simplement (1999)
 Intro concert
 "Il suffira"
 "Tu m'oublieras"
 "Rien ne peut séparer"
 "Et je vivrai à travers toi"
 "On ne s'aimera plus jamais"
 "Bouge de ma vie"
 "1,2,3 Here We Go" (Instrumental)
 "Je survivrai" ("I Will Survive")
 "Si le ciel"
 "Come Back To Me"
 Outro ("The End of the Story")
 "On ne s'aimera plus jamais" (Groove Brothers Club Mix)
 "Tu m'oublieras" (Hip Hop Mix)
 Larusso (2001)
 "Entre nous"
 "Tous unis" ("Give Me Love")
 "Prends garde à toi"
 "Habibi"
 "Les pages de l'album"
 "Danse la nuit" ("Dance All Night")
 "Quoi qu'ils pensent"
 "Même si la vie"
 "J'attends tout"
 "D'ici ou d'ailleurs"
 "J'ai samplé tes mots d'amour"
 "Il faut se le dire"

Singles
 "Je survivrai" (1997)
 "Tu m'oublieras" (1998)
 "On ne s'aimera plus jamais" (1999)
 "Il suffira" (1999)
 "Come Back to Me" (2000)
 "Tous unis" (2001)
 "Entre nous" (2001)

References

External links
 Site officiel de Larusso
 Simplement Larusso, fan site
 PurLarusso : reference site

French women pop singers
Singers from Paris
1979 births
Living people
21st-century French singers
21st-century French women singers
Masked Singer winners